His Toughest Case (German: Sein großer Fall) is a 1926 German silent crime film directed by Fritz Wendhausen and starring Alexander Murski, Christa Tordy and Olga Tschechowa. It was shot at the Babelsberg Studios in Berlin. The film's art direction was by Hans Jacoby. It premiered at the Ufa-Palast am Zoo.

Cast
 Alexander Murski as Lord Malcom  
 Christa Tordy as Aileen, Seine Tochter  
 Olga Tschechowa as Mary Melton  
 Rudolf Forster as Francis Broon  
 Carl Ebert as Kriminalkommissar Bernhard  
 Andreas Behrens-Klausen as Kriminalkommissar Schlosser  
 Hans Adalbert Schlettow as Steppke, alias Graf Strachowsky  
 Wilhelm Bendow as Kulicke, Liebhaber-Detektiv  
 Emil Heyse as Goetzke  
 Nikolai Malikoff as Simon Broon, Francis' Vater

References

Bibliography
 Grange, William. Cultural Chronicle of the Weimar Republic. Scarecrow Press, 2008.
 Jacobsen, Wolfgang. Babelsberg: ein Filmstudio 1912-1992. Argon, 1992.

External links

1926 films
Films of the Weimar Republic
German silent feature films
Films directed by Fritz Wendhausen
1926 crime films
German crime films
Films produced by Erich Pommer
Films with screenplays by Wilhelm Thiele
Films with screenplays by Fritz Wendhausen
German black-and-white films
UFA GmbH films
Films shot at Babelsberg Studios
1920s German films